A Tragic Legacy: How a Good vs. Evil Mentality Destroyed the Bush Presidency is a  New York Times bestselling book by journalist Glenn Greenwald published on June 26, 2007, by Crown Publishing Group, a division of Random House.

The Random House synopsis for the book describes A Tragic Legacy as a "character study" of George W. Bush, "one of the most controversial men to hold the office of president".  Salon.com posted an online three-page excerpt from the book on June 20, 2007.

A paperback edition of the book was published by Three Rivers Press on April 8, 2008.

Commentary and reception
In an extended entry in his blog hosted at Salon.com, Greenwald, a contributing writer for the online magazine, asks and answers the question "What 'truly motivates' George W. Bush?", providing contexts for his writing the book, and he responds to letters and other comments posted in Salon.com about the book.

Alan Colmes, of Fox News Channel's Hannity and Colmes, observed that "Glenn Greenwald is to this administration as they've been to the country: devastating. This is more than a book.  It's an act of patriotism," describing A Tragic Legacy as "the best book about the worst president."

Notes

External links
Editorial reviews – Posted at Amazon.com.
Excerpt from A Tragic Legacy: How a Good vs. Evil Mentality Destroyed the Bush Presidency – Posted at Salon.com on June 20, 2007. (3 pages.)
"FDL Book Salon Welcomes Glenn Greenwald" – As guest in FireDogLake (FDL) Book Salon on June 24, 2007 in forum on A Tragic Legacy.
A Tragic Legacy – Official Webpage and book description at Random House.

2007 non-fiction books
Books about George W. Bush
Books by Glenn Greenwald
Random House books